KROR (101.5 FM) is a radio station broadcasting a Classic rock format. Licensed to Hastings, Nebraska, United States, the station serves the Grand Island-Kearney area.  The station is currently owned by NRG Media.

References

External links

ROR
Classic rock radio stations in the United States
Radio stations established in 1975
NRG Media radio stations